The Adventures of Barry McKenzie is a 1972 Australian comedy film directed by Bruce Beresford and starring Barry Crocker, telling the story of an Australian 'yobbo' on his travels to the United Kingdom. Barry McKenzie was originally a character created by Barry Humphries for a cartoon strip in Private Eye. It was the first Australian film to surpass one million dollars in Australian box office receipts. A sequel, Barry McKenzie Holds His Own, was produced in 1974.

Barry Humphries appears in several roles, including: a hippie, Barry McKenzie's psychiatrist Doctor de Lamphrey, and as Aunt Edna Everage (later Dame Edna Everage). Humphries would later achieve fame with the character of Dame Edna in the UK and US.

The film was produced by Phillip Adams.

Plot summary
Barry 'Bazza' McKenzie (Barry Crocker) travels to England with his aunt Edna Everage (Barry Humphries) to advance his cultural education. Bazza is a young Aussie fond of beer, Bondi and beautiful 'sheilas'. He settles in Earls Court, where his old friend Curly (Paul Bertram) has a flat. He gets drunk, is ripped off, insulted by pretentious Englishmen and exploited by record producers, religious charlatans and a BBC television producer (Peter Cook). He reluctantly leaves England under the orders of his aunt, after exposing himself on television. His final words on the plane home are, "I was just starting to like the Poms!"

Cast

Barry Crocker as Barry McKenzie
Barry Humphries as Aunt Edna/Hoot/Meyer de Lamphrey
Peter Cook as Dominic
Spike Milligan as landlord
Dick Bentley as detective
Dennis Price as Mr Gort
Julie Covington as Blanche
Avice Landone as Mrs Gort
Joan Bakewell as herself
Paul Bertram as Curly
Mary Anne Severne as Lesley
Jonathan Hardy as Groove Courtney
Jenny Tomasin as Sarah Gort
Chris Malcolm as Sean
Judith Furse as Claude
Maria O'Brien as Caroline Thighs
John Joyce as Maurie Miller
Margo Lloyd as Mrs McKenzie
Brian Tapply as avant-garde composer
John Clarke as an underground filmmaker
Wilfred Grove as customs officer
William Rushton as man on plane
Bernard Spear as taxi driver
Jack Watling as TV director
Alexander Archdale 
Clive James as man passed out at party (uncredited)

Production
Bruce Beresford was living in London and knew Barry Humphries socially when he heard about government funding being given to Australian films.
I said to Barry Humphries that we should do a script from the comic strip because they had money available to make films but it hadn't occurred to them that they had no one to make them. I said, "I don't think they've thought about that but if we whip back to Australia with a script, with you starring in it and we're all set to go, we have a good chance of getting the money. There wouldn't be all that many going for it." And that's more or less what happened. 
The film was entirely funded by the Australian Film Development Corporation.  Shooting started in London in January 1972, with the unit moving to Australia in February. Local unions complained about the presence of British technicians in the crew, but a compromise was reached where Australian technicians joined the crew. Filming ended in March.

Phillip Adams wanted to cast Paul Hogan as Curly but he turned down the role. "I suspect he was concerned over his ability to work with professional actors," says Adams.

Release
Phillip Adams initially insisted on distributing the film himself, as had been done with an earlier film Adams had co-produced, The Naked Bunyip. Barry McKenzie was very popular at the box office in Australia and London, and the production company repaid the government most of its money within three months of release. Beresford went on to direct Barry McKenzie Holds His Own  again to great commercial success  in 1974.

Beresford said in a 1999 interview that both films were detrimental to his career:

Personally, it was a massive mistake for me to do it, a massive mistake, because the film was so badly received critically. Instead of getting me work, even though it was successful commercially, it put me out of work... I couldn't find anything else to make because the films were so reviled critically that I thought that, with these two films, I'll never work again.

He added that 'Luckily Phillip Adams saved my life by offering me Don's Party. But that was a couple of years later.' Don's Party and Breaker Morant restored Beresford's reputation.

Box office
This was the first Australian film to surpass $1 million at the national box office, and it led the Australian box office in 1972. The film recovered its $250,000 budget within a few months of release.

Themes
The film explores the cultural distance between Australian popular culture and the manners and mores of England, both nations presented in hyperbolically satirical manner. Barry is the extreme embodiment of  "Ockerism" of the late fifties and mid-sixties Australia. Swearing, excessive drinking, vomiting, rowdiness and other crassness is glorified. The film also plays with the ideas of the era where the sixties cultural revolution had swept aside the "certainties" of classical education.

Soundtrack
A soundtrack was released by Fable Records (FBSA 026).

Charts

References

External links
 
 The Adventures of Barry McKenzie at Australian Screen Online
The Adventures of Barry McKenzie at Oz Movies

1972 films
1972 comedy films
Australian comedy films
1970s English-language films
Films based on Australian comics
Live-action films based on comics
Films directed by Bruce Beresford
Films scored by Peter Best (composer)
1972 directorial debut films
English-language comedy films